Agonidium excisum is a species of ground beetle in the subfamily Platyninae. It was described by Henry Walter Bates in 1886.

References

excisum
Beetles described in 1886